Michael Edmund Seymour (1932 – 9 December 2018) was a British production designer. He won a BAFTA and was nominated for an Academy Award in the category Best Art Direction for his work on the 1979 film Alien. Seymour died on 9 December 2018 at the age of 86.

References

External links

1932 births
2018 deaths
Best Production Design BAFTA Award winners
British film designers
Mass media people from Southampton